The Hingis–V. Williams rivalry was a tennis rivalry between Martina Hingis and Venus Williams, who met 21 times during their careers. Their overall head-to-head was 11–10 in Hingis' favor. Their rivalry was one of the best in women's sports and has been called a "rivalry for the ages".

Head-to-head

Singles

Martina Hingis–Venus Williams (11–10)

Doubles

Martina Hingis–Venus Williams (2–2)

Exhibitions

Singles

Martina Hingis–Venus Williams (3–3)

Doubles

Martina Hingis–Venus Williams (1–1)

Mixed doubles

Martina Hingis–Venus Williams (2–3)

Breakdown of the rivalry
Hard courts: Hingis, 7–5
Clay courts: Tied, 3–3
Grass courts: Williams, 1–0
Carpet: Tied, 1–1
Grand Slam matches: Hingis, 4–2
Grand Slam finals: Hingis, 1–0
Year-End Championships matches: Hingis, 1–0
Year-End Championships finals: None
Fed Cup matches: None
All finals: Hingis, 3–1

See also
List of tennis rivalries

References

Tennis rivalries
Sports rivalries in the United States